The 1975 UNLV Rebels football team was an American football team that represented the University of Nevada, Las Vegas as an independent during the 1975 NCAA Division II football season. In their third and final year under head coach Ron Meyer, the team compiled a 7–4 record; all four losses were to teams from the Big Sky Conference.

Two months after the season, Meyer departed for Southern Methodist University in Dallas, and was succeeded by Tony Knap, the head coach at Boise State.

Schedule

References

UNLV
UNLV Rebels football seasons
UNLV Rebels football